Dragon Fight is a 1989 Hong Kong action film directed by Billy Tang, with a screenplay written by James Yuen, and starring Jet Li, Nina Li Chi and Stephen Chow.

Synopsis
Lee Kwok-Lap and Wong Wai were childhood buddies who grew up training together in the state-sponsored martial arts troupe. Wai felt there was no future in the troupe and plotted to remain illegally in the USA when the troupe was on a performance tour. Lap found out at the airport just before their return flight and tried to stop Wai. Lap not only failed to dissuade Wai, he also became the unwitting scapegoat after Wai unintentionally killed an airport police. Both went separate paths.

Lap was sheltered by Yao who admired Lap's skills. Lap began working in Yao's uncle's grocery store while evading police manhunt. Wai took up with the mob lieutenant, Marco, and began to impress the bosses with his ruthless efficiency at getting rid of rival gangs.

When the Big Boss decided to give Wai the chance to conduct a major drug deal, the jealous Marco tipped off the police to discredit Wai. Wai escaped the police but lost the drugs. Yao accidentally found the drugs and decided it was his ticket to get rich. However, his attempt to sell the drugs led the mob back to his uncle's grocery store. The Big Boss ordered Wai to prove his worth to the mob by cleaning up the mess and finishing off Lap.

Cast
 Jet Li as Lee Kwok-Lap
 Nina Li Chi as Kuen
 Stephen Chow as Yao
 Dick Wei as Wong Wai
 Henry Fong as Marco
 Robert Urich as Airport Police
 Scott Coker as Big Boss's Bodyguard
 Kenny Perez as Big Boss's Gangster
 Mike Kim as Vietnamese Killer
 Darren Pang as Vietnamese Killer
 Barry Wong as Drug Dealer
 Steven Ho as Big Boss's Gangster
 Ernie Reyes, Sr. as Big Boss's Killer
 George Chung as Big Boss's Killer

References

External links

1989 films
1989 action films
1989 martial arts films
Hong Kong action films
Hong Kong martial arts films
Kung fu films
Wushu films
1980s Cantonese-language films
Films directed by Billy Tang
Films set in San Francisco
Films shot in San Francisco
1980s Hong Kong films